Melissa Brown (born 1974) is an American artist who lives and works in New York. Brown is known for her paintings and her public artwork. 

Her work is included in the collection of the Whitney Museum of American Art.

References

External links
 Official website

 
1974 births
21st-century American women artists
Artists from New York City
Living people